The CUNYAC men's basketball tournament is the annual conference basketball championship tournament for the NCAA Division III City University of New York Athletic Conference. The tournament has been held annually since 1966. It is a single-elimination tournament and seeding is based on regular season records.

The winner, declared CUNYAC conference champion, receives the league's automatic bid to the NCAA Men's Division III Basketball Championship.

Staten Island, with 15 titles, are the most successful program in tournament history.

Results

Championship records

 Schools highlighted in pink are former members of the CUNYAC

References

NCAA Division III men's basketball conference tournaments
Tournament
Recurring sporting events established in 1966